= Republic of China national football team =

Republic of China national football team may refer to:

- China national football team, which represented the 1912–1949 Republic of China
- Chinese Taipei national football team, which has represented Taiwan since 1949
